17 teams took part in the league with FC Torpedo Moscow winning the championship.
FC Torpedo Moscow qualified for Champions Cup 1966–67 and FC Spartak Moscow qualified for CWC 1966–67.

League standings

Results

Top scorers
18 goals
 Oleg Kopayev (SKA Rostov-on-Don)

17 goals
 Eduard Malofeyev (Dinamo Minsk)

15 goals
 Boris Kazakov (CSKA Moscow)

13 goals
 Lev Gorshkov (Lokomotiv Moscow)
 Gennadi Krasnitsky (Pakhtakor)

12 goals
 Eduard Streltsov (Torpedo Moscow)

11 goals
 Mikhail Mustygin (Dinamo Minsk)
 Viktor Serebryanikov (Dynamo Kyiv)

10 goals
 Andriy Biba (Dynamo Kyiv)
 Dzhumber Khazhaliya (Torpedo Kutaisi)
 Vitaly Khmelnitsky (Dynamo Kyiv)
 Valeri Lobanovsky (Chornomorets)
 Eduard Markarov (Neftyanik)
 Ishtvan Sekech (SKA Odessa)

References

 Soviet Union - List of final tables (RSSSF)

Soviet Top League seasons
1
Soviet
Soviet